Canada–New Zealand relations are the international relations between Canada and New Zealand. Canada and New Zealand have a longstanding relationship that has been fostered by both countries' shared history and culture, and links between residents of both countries. The two countries are former British Dominions and have a common head of state in King Charles III (legally, the King is equally and separately the sovereign of both nations, as King of Canada and King of New Zealand). Both nations are members of the Asia-Pacific Economic Cooperation, Cairns Group, Commonwealth of Nations, Five Eyes, OECD and the United Nations.

Country comparison

Political similarities

Party politics in New Zealand are fought between the centre-left Labour Party, the centre-right National Party and several smaller parties.  In Canada the main players are the Conservatives, the centre-left Liberals, the leftist New Democratic Party and the separatist Bloc Québécois.  The economic policies of New Zealand were restructured by Roger Douglas and partially inspired government cutbacks advocated by Canadian leaders such as Ralph Klein, Mike Harris and Paul Martin. Canada and New Zealand have been compared to one another for them "living in the shadow" of their much more prominent neighbour (the United States and Australia, respectively).

Military alliances 

New Zealand and Canada have fought together in the Second Boer War, World War I, World War II, the Korean War, the Gulf War and the Afghanistan War. Both countries refused to participate in the Iraq War even though other major Anglosphere countries such as the United States, United Kingdom and Australia took part. As of 2014 all Canadian forces have completely withdrawn from Afghanistan while a small number of New Zealand forces still remain.

Cooperation between military forces 
Historically their two armed forces have worked alongside each other in a number of international security operations. Recent defence operations include strategic actions in Timor Leste, Bosnia and Afghanistan, training exercises and staff exchanges.

These positive and longstanding defence links with Canada and New Zealand are enhanced by the regular purchase of new military equipment from either country; e.g. New Zealand's purchase of 105 Light Armoured vehicles (LAV IIIs) from Canada.

Wars fought together

Alliance during World War II 

As part of their ongoing participation in the British Commonwealth both countries were expected to aid Britain when it declared war on Germany.  However, since the Statute of Westminster they had both won the power to declare war independently of Britain.  Politically, New Zealand had been a vocal opponent of European fascism and the appeasement of those dictatorships. At the beginning of the war Canada was (for the most part) reluctant to return to war. Nonetheless, both countries entered the war as Allies: New Zealand declared war on Nazi Germany at 9.30 pm September 3, 1939 (NZT); Canada on September 10, 1939. However, the two countries' armies only occasionally fought together. Canada's main effort encompassed major campaigns in Italy  and Northern Europe whereas the New Zealanders mainly fought in Greece, Crete and Italy.

Korean War 1950–1953 

New Zealand and Canada were among those states that responded to the United Nations call for help. New Zealand joined 15 other nations including Canada, the United Kingdom and the United States in the anti-communist war. The Korean War was also significant as it fastened New Zealand's military and diplomatic co-operation in supporting Canada and the United States in conflict.

The British Commonwealth Forces Korea was a joint effort between allied Commonwealth forces: namely Britain, Canada, Australia and New Zealand.

Afghanistan (2001–2005) 

New Zealand and Canada's heaviest joint military involvement in the Middle East in recent decades has been in Afghanistan following the United States-led invasion of that country after the September 11 attacks. Fifty Special Air Service of New Zealand (NZ SAS) units were dispatched and in March 2002 they took part in Operation Anaconda alongside Canadian forces against about 500 to 1,000 al-Qaeda and Taliban forces in the Shahi-Kot Valley and Arma Mountains southeast of Zorma, Afghanistan. New Zealand has also supplied two transport aircraft and a 122-strong tri-service Provincial Reconstruction Team which has been located in Bamyan Province since 2003. Both New Zealand (NZ SAS) and Canadian (Joint Task Force 2) special forces have won the American Presidential Unit Citation for operations in Afghanistan.

"Operation Anaconda" was an operation composed of elements of the United States 10th Mountain Division, 101st Airborne Division, the US special forces groups (TF 11, TF Bowie and TF Dagger), British Royal Marines, Canada's 3rd Battalion Princess Patricia's Canadian Light Infantry, the Afghan National Army, the German KSK and elements of both the Australian Special Air Service Regiment and the New Zealand Special Air Service.

This was one of the first major NZ-Canada joint operations of the War in Afghanistan and proved to be a very successful partnership between the two nations' military forces.

Trade and investment

The Canadian and New Zealand Consulates offer advice to New Zealand businesses interested in forming partnerships with Canada, investing in Canada or setting up a business in Canada. In the same way they help to connect Canadian business people who wish to sell their goods and services to New Zealand with potential local partners and assist Canadian companies looking to invest in New Zealand.

There is mass trade between Canada and New Zealand that has proven reliable to both countries making it an important and stable base for a long-lasting relationship. In 2011, bilateral trade levels totalled (CAD) $932 million. Canadian exports to New Zealand amounted to $382 million, with fertilizers, machinery, meat, books, electrical equipment and wood products being Canada's top exports. Meat and wine were New Zealand's top exports to Canada.

Canada's main exports to New Zealand included aircraft, electrical equipment, machinery and fertilizers for 2006. Canada's leading imports from New Zealand include meat, dairy products, agricultural machinery and wine. New Zealand offers many opportunities for Canadian companies particularly in energy, extractive industries, telecommunications and food products.

Canada was New Zealand's 12th largest export destination and 14th largest trading partner in the year ended December 2006 with exports of NZ$553 million. There are significant Canadian investments in New Zealand, particularly McCains and communications company Stratos Global Corporation. New Zealand companies in Canada include Tait Electronics, Michael Hill Jeweller, Peace Software and Glidepath.

Auckland Airport CPPIB buyout
There was some debate in the New Zealand Government about the Canada Pension Plan Investment Board (CPPIB), the Crown corporation that manages assets on behalf of the Canada Pension Plan, trying to buy a 40% stake in Auckland Airport, a strategic asset for the New Zealand government, with the Labour Party trying to block the sale by passing new laws which prevent foreign acquisitions of New Zealand "strategic assets". It was announced on April 11, 2008, that the CPPIB had given up on its bid on Auckland Airport after many attempts by the New Zealand government to restrict foreign investment in New Zealand's infrastructure. The CPPIB said it was "disappointed in the outcome of its Overseas Investment Act application"

Air services
The Canada/New Zealand Air Transport Agreement was signed in 1985. Both countries' respective national airlines, Air Canada and Air New Zealand, are members of the Star Alliance. In November 2007, Air New Zealand began a non-stop service between Auckland and Vancouver which operates three times a week.

Film and television
The 1987 Agreement on "Film and Video Relations" between the two countries has been successful with film and television co-operation growing.  Particular interest has been shown in indigenous film linkages and co-productions. There is a recent but ongoing pattern of producers' missions between Canada, New Zealand and Australia. Whale Rider won the People's Choice Award at the Toronto International Film Festival in 2002 and nine out of the ten top-grossing centres in North America for New Zealand's Lord of the Rings were in Canada.

One of New Zealand's leading television channels TV3 was, until 2007, owned by Canadian Media Conglomerate CanWest.

New Zealand, Canada and the UKUSA Community

New Zealand and Canada are both exclusive members of a collection of five countries who participate in the highly secretive ECHELON program. New Zealand has two (known) listening posts run by the Government Communications Security Bureau (GCSB) as part of the ECHELON spy network. New Zealand has benefited from its role in the ECHELON communications interception network which also includes the United States, Australia, Britain and Canada and are known as the UKUSA Community. The partnership gives "a direct line into the inner circles of power in London and Washington".
New Zealand's role in the program is based at a listening post on the South Island of New Zealand at Waihopai Valley just south-west of Blenheim. Its primary role is the interception of a large volume of satellite phone calls, telexes, faxes, e-mail and computer data communications. It gathers this data from New Zealand's Asia/Pacific neighbours and forwards it on to the major partners in the UKUSA Agreement.

The Waihopai station is a sister operation to a similar facility run at Tangimoana.

This gives New Zealand a distinct partnership with Canada not just on economic policies but domestic security agreements and operations as well and is a familiar platform for further deals involving both countries.

UKUSA military exercises
The UKUSA community allows member countries to cooperate in multilateral military exercises which have more recently focused on terrorism after 9/11.
On March 10, 2008 (NZT) New Zealand, Canada, Australia, the United States and the United Kingdom took part in a multinational war game that simulated a terrorist attack on "strategic networks" such as power grids, financial centres and telecommunications focussing mainly on cyber-terrorism. The exercise was named Cyber Storm 2 and was co-ordinated by the United States Department of Homeland Security and the New Zealand Government Communications Security Bureau. It will be used to identify policies & issues that affect cyber response & recovery by government agencies.

After the exercise the NZ 'CCIP' (Centre for Critical Infrastructure Protection) said in a statement: "The New Zealand component of the exercise was successful in testing information sharing and response coordination across both public and private sectors and national and international cooperation,"

A report on the overall results will be published ahead of Cyber Storm III which is scheduled for 2010.

Strategic Alliance Cyber Crime Working Group
The Strategic Alliance Cyber Crime Working Group' is a new initiative by Australia, Canada, New Zealand, the United Kingdom and headed by the United States as a "formal partnership between these nations dedicated to tackling larger global crime issues, particularly organized crime". The co–operation consists of "five countries from three continents banding together to fight cyber crime in a synergistic way by sharing intelligence, swapping tools and best practices, and strengthening and even synchronizing their respective laws." This means that there will be increased information sharing between the New Zealand Police and the Royal Canadian Mounted Police (RCMP) on matters relating to serious fraud or cyber crime.

New Zealand tours by Canadian delegates and ministers

Canadian tours by New Zealand delegates and ministers

Tourism
In the year ending December 2013, 48,192 Canadian tourists visited New Zealand, making Canada the eighth largest source of tourists. Canadians can visit New Zealand without a visa for up to three months and New Zealanders can visit Canada without a visa for up to six months, provided they meet financial, health and character requirements.

Both Canada and New Zealand offer "Working Holiday Schemes". These schemes allow young students to travel to New Zealand or Canada and to take temporary employment as needed to cover the expenses of their visit. Canadian participants receive the same treatment as New Zealand nationals in all matters concerning the application of laws, regulations and practices regarding health and working conditions. On November 14, 2014 Prime Minister Stephen Harper and Prime Minister John Key agreed to extend the Working Holiday Scheme from 12 months to 23 months. This new visa came into effect on April 1, 2015. This is the most generous working holiday scheme New Zealand has with any other country, including the United Kingdom.

In recent years there has been growing support for the idea of freedom of movement between the UK, Canada and Australia, New Zealand with citizens able to live and work in any of the four countries - similar to the Trans-Tasman Travel Arrangement between Australia and New Zealand.

Resident diplomatic missions
 Canada has a high commission in Wellington and a consulate in Auckland.
 New Zealand has a high commission in Ottawa and a consulate-general in Vancouver.

See also

Foreign relations of New Zealand
Foreign relations of Canada
List of Canadian High Commissioners to New Zealand
List of High Commissioners from New Zealand to Canada
New Zealand–United States relations
UKUSA Community
AUSCANNZUKUS

References

External links
 New Zealand High Commission in Canada Official Site
 New Zealand Government Official Site
 High Commission in New Zealand – Official Site
 Canadian Government – Official Site

 
New Zealand
Bilateral relations of New Zealand